Keb' Mo' is the second studio album by Delta blues artist Keb' Mo'.  Commonly thought of as his debut, the artist previously released an album in 1980, Rainmaker, under his birth name "Kevin Moore" (of which "Keb' Mo'" is a variation).

Track listing
All songs written by Kevin Moore (Keb' Mo') unless otherwise noted.
 "Every Morning" – 3:00
 "Tell Everybody I Know" – 3:10
 "Love Blues" – 3:02 (Kevin Moore, Eugene Powell)
 "Victims Of Comfort" – 3:21 (Kevin Moore, Tim Kimber)
 "Angelina" – 3:47 (Kevin Moore, Georgina Graper)
 "Anybody Seen My Girl" – 2:56
 "She Just Wants To Dance" – 3:29 (Kevin Moore, Georgina Graper)
 "Am I Wrong" – 2:19
 "Come On In My Kitchen" – 4:09 (Robert Johnson)
 "Dirty Low Down And Bad" – 3:08
 "Don't Try To Explain" – 3:58
 "Kindhearted Woman Blues" – 3:29 (Robert Johnson)
 "City Boy" – 4:05

Personnel
 Keb' Mo' – vocals, guitars, harmonica, banjo
 Tommy Eyre – keyboards
 James "Hutch" Hutchinson – bass guitar
 Laval Belle – drums
 Quentin Dennard – drums on "Angelina"
 Tony Braunagel – percussion on "Come On in My Kitchen"

Charts

References

1994 albums
Keb' Mo' albums
Albums produced by John Porter (musician)
Epic Records albums